The Whammer is a nickname that may refer to:

Jim Traber, major league baseball player and sportscaster
"The Whammer" (WordGirl), a villain in the TV series WordGirl
Walter 'The Whammer' Whambold, a character in the novel The Natural